Marko Vančagović  (born 5 November 1998) is a Serbian football defender, playing for BSK Borča.

Club career

BSK Borča
Born in Belgrade, Vančagović played with OFK Beograd and BSK Borča through the youth categories. He joined the first team of BSK Borča at the beginning of 2017, making a senior debut in a friendly match against Partizan on 18 January. Shortly after, Vančagović signed a four-year scholarship contract with the club. Vančagović made his official debut for BSK Borča in 25 fixture match of the 2016–17 Serbian First League season, against Jagodina, played on 25 March 2017.

Career statistics

Club

References

1998 births
Living people
Footballers from Belgrade
Serbian footballers
Association football defenders
FK BSK Borča players
Serbian First League players